Terje Hartviksen (born 19 January 1950) is a Norwegian actor, stage director and theatre director.

He began his career at Teatret Vårt in 1975. He was the director of Teater Ibsen from 1989 to 1994, Riksteatret from 1994 to 1996 and Brageteatret from 2000.

References

1950 births
Living people
Norwegian male stage actors
Norwegian theatre directors